Ling Liu from the Georgia Institute of Technology, Atlanta was named Fellow of the Institute of Electrical and Electronics Engineers (IEEE) in 2015 for contributions to scalable Internet data management and decentralized trust management.

References

Fellow Members of the IEEE
Living people
Year of birth missing (living people)
Place of birth missing (living people)
Georgia Tech faculty
American electrical engineers